The 2012–13 BKT Superliga was the 19th season of the Kosovo Basketball Superleague, also called BKT Superliga in its sponsored identity it's the highest professional basketball league in Kosovo.

The regular season started on 12 October 2012 and finished on 29 April 2013, after all teams had played 28 games. The 4 best ranked teams advanced to the play-off phase whilst KB Kosova Vushtrri was relegated to the Liga e Parë e Kosoves ne Baskbetboll after finishing last in the league table.

The play-offs started on 1 May 2015 and finished on 14 May 2015, KB Peja won their 6th title by beating Sigal Prishtina 3:0 in a 3-game final.

Regular season 

|}

Playoffs 
Same as last year, the semi-finals were played in a best-of-four format.

Awards
MVP:  Dardan Berisha – KB Peja
Finals MVP:  Dardan Berisha – KB Peja
Foreigner MVP:  Adam Waleskowski – Sigal Prishtina
Coach of the Year:  Rudolf Jugo – KB Peja

References 

Kosovo Basketball Superleague seasons
Kosovo
basketball